Jan-Erik Wikström (born 11 September 1932) is a Swedish publisher and politician, who served as Minister for Education between 1976 and 1982.

His father, Börje Wikström, was a pastor in the Swedish Evangelical Mission (EFS) and his mother, Essy Wikström, was an elementary school teacher.

Wikström was head of the publishing house Gummessons from 1963 to 1976. He was elected into the Swedish Parliament in 1970, representing the People's Party (subsequently the Liberals). He became Minister for Education in the Fälldin I Cabinet in 1976, and remained on that post in the cabinets Fälldin II, Ullsten and Fälldin III, with a brief stint as acting Minister of Commerce and Industry in 1981. When the Social Democratic second Cabinet of Olof Palme took over after the 1982 Swedish general election, Wikström left the government.

He was appointed Governor of Uppsala County in 1992, and held the position until his retirement in 1997.

Wikström has been married three times: to teacher and author Grethel Wikström from 1955 to 1979, to concert pianist Inger Wikström between 1980 and 1990, and to priest and politician Cecilia Wikström from 1995 to 2010. Photographer Jeppe Wikström is his son from his first marriage.

References

Living people
1932 births
Liberals (Sweden) politicians
Governors of Uppsala County
Commandeurs of the Ordre des Arts et des Lettres
Swedish Ministers for Education